UB Law may refer to:
University of Baltimore School of Law, in Baltimore, Maryland
University at Buffalo Law School, in Buffalo, New York